Maria Aurelia Capmany i Farnés (3 August 1918, in Barcelona – 2 October 1991) was a Catalan novelist, playwright and essayist. She was also a prominent feminist cultural and anti-Franco activist.

Along with the writers Manuel de Pedrolo, Jordi Sarsanedas, Joan Perucho, and Josep Maria Espinàs, Capmany co-authored, Cita de narradors ("Rendezvous of Narrators") (1958), which was awarded the Josep Yxart Essay Prize.

Biography 
Granddaughter of Sebastià Farnés (1854-1934), intellectual author of Paremiologia catalana comparada, and daughter of Aureli Capmany i Farrés, folklorist and contributor of children's magazines, she spent her youth in the family's apartment near la Rambla in Barcelona. She studied at the Institut-Escola de la Generalitat de Catalunya and she graduated on Philosophy at the University of Barcelona after the war.

She practiced teaching during the 40s and 50s at the Institut Albéniz of Badalona and at the Escola Isabel de Villena in Barcelona. She also worked engraving glass, a job that she had learnt at University.

With her first novel Necessitem morir (We need to die) (published in 1952), she got to the final of the Joanot Martorell Price of 1947, price that she won the following year with El cel no és trasparent (The sky is not transparent). Her prestige as a narrator would arrive with novels like Betúlia, El gust de la pols (The flavour of dust) and especially for Un lloc entre els morts (A place for the death), Sant Jordi Price of 1968. In 1981 she received the Ramon Fuster Price, given by the Col·legi Oficial de Doctors i Llicenciats en Filosofia i Lletres i en Ciències de Catalunya and in 1983 she won the Premi Crítica Serra d'Or de Literatura Infantil i Juvenil with El malefici de la reina d'Hongria (The curse of the Hungarian Queen).

She was one of the most versatile Catalan writers, as apart from writing fiction, she was also devoted to translation, and she worked on the theatrical genre as well as on other literary genres.

In the field of dramaturgy, she founded in 1959 the Escola d'Art Dramàtic Adrià Gual (School of Dramatic Arts Adrià Gual) together with Ricard Salvat. She exercised as a teacher, actress and headmaster. Besides, she premiered own plays, such as Preguntes i respostes sobre la vida i la mort de Francesc Layret advocat dels obrers de Catalunya (Answers and questions about life and dead of Francesc Layret, lawyer of Catalan workers).

As an essay writer, she excelled for her works on the situation of women, especially with La dona a Catalunya: consciència i situació (The woman in Catalonia: awareness and situation) in 1966. The same year, she took part in the Caputxinada, an assembly against the Spanish dictator Franco. She also devoted many articles to several aspects of Catalan culture and society. The book of memories Pedra de toc (1 and 2), Mala memòria, and Això era i no era also excelled.

She took part and intervened in the Míting de la Llibertat (Meeting of freedom) (June 22, 1976) and in the constitutional process of Socialist Party of Catalonia-Congress (November 1976).

She was councillor and responsible for Culture and Editions at Barcelona's Town Hall during the first legislatures of the Socialists' Party of Catalonia (PSC) and member of the Diputation of Barcelona, since 1983 until she died on 2 October 1991. She was also member of the Associació d'Escriptors en Llengua Catalana, and president of the Catalan PEN Club, the Catalan version of the PEN International.

Work

Novel
 Necessitem morir. Barcelona: Aymà, 1952 / Barcelona: Proa, 1977
 L'altra ciutat. Barcelona: Selecta, 1955
 Tana o la felicitat. Palma de Mallorca: Moll, 1956
 Betúlia. Barcelona: Selecta, 1956
 Ara. Barcelona: Albertí, 1958/ Barcelona: Plaza & Janés, 1988
 Traduït de l'americà. Barcelona: Albertí, 1959
 El gust de la pols. Barcelona: Destino, 1962 / Barcelona: Edicions 62, 1986
 La pluja als vidres. Barcelona: Club Editor, 1963
 El desert dels dies. Barcelona: Occitània, 1966
 Un lloc entre els morts. Barcelona: Nova Terra, 1967 / Barcelona: Laia, 1979 / Barcelona: Edicions 62, 1984 / Barcelona: Proa, 1999
 Feliçment, jo sóc una dona. Barcelona: Nova Terra, 1969 / Barcelona: Laia, 1983 / Barcelona: Barcanova, 1994
 Vitrines d'Amsterdam. Barcelona: Club Editor, 1970
 Quim-Quima. Barcelona: Estela, 1971 / Barcelona: Laia, 1977 / Barcelona: Planeta, 1991
 El jaqué de la democràcia. Barcelona: Nova Terra, 1972 / Barcelona: La Magrana, 1987
 Vés-te'n ianqui. Barcelona: Laia, 1980 / Barcelona: Barcanova, 2006
 Lo color més blau. Barcelona: Planeta, 1983
 El cap de Sant Jordi. Barcelona: Planeta, 1988.

Short narrative
 Com una mà. Palma de Mallorca: Moll, 1952
 Cartes impertinents de dona a dona. Palma de Mallorca: Moll, 1971
 Numnius Dexter Optatur, Papa de Roma. Barcelona: Tarot, 1971
 Coses i noses. Barcelona: La Magrana, 1980
 Fumar o no fumar : vet aquí la qüestió (with Pere Calders). Barcelona: Destino, 1988
 Aquelles dames d'altres temps. Barcelona: Planeta, 1990
 De veu a veu: contes i narracions. [with Montserrat Roig]. Barcelona: Cercle de Lectors, 2001

Literature for children and young adults 
 Anna, Bel i Carles. Barcelona: Lumen, 1971
 Ni teu, ni meu. Barcelona: La Galera, 1972
 L'alt rei en Jaume. Barcelona: Aymà, 1977
 Àngela i els vuit mil policies. Barcelona: Laia, 1981
 El malefici de la reina d'Hongria o Les aventures dels tres patrons de nau. Barcelona: Barcanova, 1982
 Contes. Barcelona: Publicacions de l'Abadia de Montserrat, 1993
 La rialla del mirall. Barcelona: Empúries, 1989

Drama
 Tu i l'hipòcrita. Palma de Mallorca: Moll, 1960
 Vent de garbí i una mica de por. Palma de Mallorca: Moll, 1968
 Preguntes i respostes sobre la vida i la mort de Francesc Layret, advocat dels obrers de Catalunya.  [with Xavier Romeu i Jover]. París: Edicions * Catalanes de París, 1970 / Madrid: Moisés Pérez Coterillo, 1976 / Barcelona: Institut del Teatre-Diputació de Barcelona, 1992
 L'ombra de l'escorpí. València: Gorg, 1974
 El cavaller Tirant. Barcelona: Edebé, 1974
 Tirant lo Blanc. València: Eliseu Climent / 3i4, 1980
 Ca, barret!   [with Jaume Vidal Alcover]. Palma de Mallorca: Moll, 1984

Essay
 Cita de narradors (with Manuel de Pedrolo, Jordi Sarsanedas, Joan Perucho i Josep M. Espinàs). Barcelona: Selecta, 1958 
 Historias de Barcelona [fotografies de A. Basté]. Barcelona: Barrigotic, 1963
 La dona a Catalunya : consciència i situació. Barcelona: Ed. 62, 1966
 Dia sí, dia no : apunts sobre la nostra societat actual. Barcelona: Llibres de Sinera, 1968
 La dona catalana. Barcelona: Mateu, 1968
 Els vells. Barcelona: Mateu, 1968
 La joventut és una nova classe? Barcelona: Edicions 62, 1969
 El feminismo ibérico.. Vilassar de Mar: Oikos-tau, 1970
 De profesión mujer. Esplugues de Llobregat: Plaza & Janés, 1971
 Salvador Espriu. Barcelona: Dopesa, 1972
 El feminisme a Catalunya. Barcelona: Nova Terra, 1973
 Poema i vers o El cor salvatge de Carles Riba. Barcelona: Institut d'Estudis Hel·lènics - Departament de Filologia Catalana, Universitat de Barcelona, 1973 
 Carta abierta al macho ibérico. Madrid: Ediciones 99, 1973 
 El comportamiento amoroso de la mujer. Barcelona: Dopesa, 1974 
 La dona. Barcelona: Dopesa, 1976 
 Cada cosa en el seu temps i lectura cada dia. Barcelona: Dopesa, 1976 
 Subirachs o el retreat de l'artista com a escultor adult. Barcelona: Dopesa, 1976 
 La dona i la Segona República. Barcelona: Ed. 62, 1977 
 Temps passat, notícia d'avui: una història de Catalunya. Barcelona: Vicens Vives, 1978 
 Dies i hores de la Nova Cançó. Barcelona: Abadia de Montserrat, 1978 
 Antifémina (with Colita). Madrid: Editora Nacional, 1978 
 En busca de la mujer española. Barcelona: Laia, 1982 
 Diàlegs a Barcelona: M. Aurèlia Capmany, Pasqual Maragall [interview transcribed by Xavier Febrés]. Barcelona: Ajuntament de Barcelona-Laia, 1984  
 Retrobar Barcelona [with Jaume Sobraqués]. Barcelona: Lunwerg, 1986 
 Fem memòria. El port de Barcelona. Barcelona: Lunwerg, 1990 
¿Qué diablos es Cataluña? Madrid: Temas de hoy, 1990 
 Barcelona entre mar i muntanya. Barcelona: Polígrafa, 1992

Memoirs
 Pedra de toc (2 vol.). Barcelona: Nova Terra, 1970 – 1974 
 Dietari de prudències. Barcelona: La Llar del Llibre, 1981 
 Mala memòria. Barcelona: Planeta, 1987 
 Això era i no era. Barcelona: Planeta, 1989

Comic
 Dona, doneta, donota (with Avel·lí Artís-Gener). Barcelona: EDHASA, 1979

Complete work
 Obra completa (7 volumes). Barcelona: Columna, 1993 – 2000 (edition by Guillem-Jordi Graells)

Scripts
 L'alt rei en Jaume. Television, 1977 – 1978 
 La nina. Televisió, 1977-1978 [based on Casa de nines by Ibsen]. 
 Tereseta-que-baixava-les-escale. Television, 1977-1978 [based on tale by Salvador Espriu] 
 Aquesta nit no vindrem a sopar. Television, 1978 – 1979  
 La nit catalana. Television, 1978-1979 
 Temps passat, notícia d'avui. Ràdio 4, 1979 
 Història de Catalunya, 1977-1978 (45 capítols). Radio. Cassette edition (1979). 
 Les nits de la tieta Rosa. Television, 1980

Translations

From French
 BALZAC, Honoré de: L'última encarnació de Vautrin. Barcelona: Nova Terra, 1972 
 DURAS, Marguerite: Un dic contra el pacífic [Un barrage contre le Pacifique]. Barcelona: Edicions 62, Col. El Balancí 2, 1965 
 FOURNIER, Alain: El gran Meaulnes [Le grand Meaulnes]. Barcelona: Edicions 62, Col. El Trapezi 10, 1966 
 KASSAK, Fred: Carambolades [Carambolages]. Barcelona: Edicions 62, Col. La cua de palla, 1963 
 LAFONT, Robert: Història de la literatura occitana. Barcelona: Dopesa, Col. Pinya de Rosa 8 i 9, 1973 
 PROUST, Marcel: A la recerca del temps perdut [À la recherche du temps perdu]. Barcelona: Columna, 1990-1991 [with Jaume Vidal Alcover] 
 SARTRE, Jean-Paul: Fenomenologia i existencialisme [L'existencialisme est un humanisme]. Barcelona: Laia, 1982 
 SIMENON, Georges: Liberty Bar. Barcelona: Edicions 62, Col. La cua de palla 28, 1965  
 SIMENON, Georges: El gos groc [Le chien jaune]. Barcelona: Edicions 62, Col. La cua de palla 48, 1966 / Barcelona: Àrea, 1989 / Barcelona: Columna, 1995  
 SIMENON, Georges: La nit de la cruïlla. Barcelona: Edicions 62, Col. La cua de palla, 1966  
 SIMENON, Georges: L'Ombra xinesa. Barcelona: Edicions 62, Col. La cua de palla 54, 1967 
 SIMENON, Georges: Maigret i el client del dissabte [Maigret et le client du samedi]. Barcelona: Edicions 62, Col. La cua de palla 62, 1968 
 SIMENON, Georges: Signat Picpus [Signée Picpus]. Barcelona: Edicions 62, Col. La cua de palla 65, 1968  
 STEWART, Terry: Mà forta [La belle vie]. Barcelona: Edicions 62, Col. La cua de palla 2, 1963 
 VÉRY, Pierre: El senyor Marcel de la funerària. Barcelona: Edicions 62, Col. La cua de palla 19, 1964  
 VÉRY, Pierre: Goupi Mans-Roges [Goupi Mans-Rouges]. Barcelona: Edicions 62, Col. La cua de palla 16, 1964

From Italian 
 CALVINO, Italo: El baró rampant [Il barone rampante]. Barcelona: Edicions 62, Col. El Balancí 7, 1965 / Barcelona: Avui, 1995  
 CASSOLA, Carlo: La tala del bosc [Il taglio del bosco]. Barcelona: Edicions 62, Col. El Trapezi 8, 1966 
 CHIARINI, Luigi: Art i tècnica del film [Arte e tecnica del film]. Barcelona: Edicions 62, Col. A l'abast 13, 1967 
 LIONNI, Leo: Frederick. Barcelona: Lumen, 1969 
 PASOLINI, Pier Paolo: Una vida violenta [Una vita violenta]. Barcelona: Edicons 62, Col. El Balancí 32, 1967  
 PAVESE, Cesare: La lluna i les fogueres [La luna e il falò]. Barcelona: Edicions 62, Col. El Balancí 12, 1965 
 PIRANDELLO, Luigi: Aquesta nit improvisem [Questa notte si recita a soggetto]. Barcelona: Institut del Teatre-Diputació de Barcelona, 1996 
 PRATOLINI, Vasco: Crònica dels pobres amants [Cronache di poveri amanti]. Barcelona: Edicions 62, Col. El Balancí 1, 1965  
 PRATOLINI, Vasco: Metel·lo [Metello]. Barcelona: Edicions 62, Col. El Balancí 15, 1966 
 VITTORINI, Elio: Conversa a Sicília [Conversazione in Sicilia]. Barcelona: Edicions 62, Col. El Balancí 19, 1966

From English 
 CAIN, James M.: Doble indemnització [Double Indemnity]. Barcelona: Edicions 62, Col. La cua de palla 28, 1965

Fonts bibliogràfiques i documentals 

 Caampillo, Maria i Castellanos, Jordi (1988). “Maria Aurèlia Capmany”, en Història de la literatura catalana, vol. 11. Barcelona: Ariel, pàgs. 62-71.
 Dale may, Barbara (2000). “Maria Aurèlia Capmany y el activismo polifacético” en Breve historia feminista de la literatura española (en lengua catalana, gallega y vasca), Vol. VI, Iris M. Zavala (coord.). Barcelona: Anthropos, pàgs. 92-99.
 DD.AA. (1986).  Maria Aurèlia Capmany en els seus millors escrits. Barcelona: Miquel Arimany editor.
 DD.AA. (1991). Montserrat Roig/ Maria Aurèlia Capmany en homenatge. Barcelona: Institució de les Lletres Catalanes. 
 DD.AA. (1992). Maria Aurèlia Capmany Farnés (1918-1991). Barcelona: Ajuntament de Barcelona. 
 DD.AA. (2002). Un lloc entre els vius. Homenatge a Maria Aurèlia Capmany. Barcelona: Partit dels Socialistes de Catalunya.
 DD.AA. (1992). Maria Aurèlia Capmany: homenatge. Barcelona: Ajuntament de Barcelona/Centre Català del Pen Club. 
 DD.AA. (1993). Catalan Review. International Journal of Catalan Culture. Woman, History and Nation in the Works of Montserrat Roig and Maria Aurèlia Capmany. Vol. VII, núm. 2. 
 DD.AA. (1994). Feliçment sóc una dona: homenatge a Maria Aurèlia Capmany. Barcelona: Ajuntament de Barcelona.  
 DD.AA. (2002). “Universos” dins l'Univers: elles hi són: Jornada homenatge a Maria Aurèlia Capmany i Montserrat Roig. Barcelona: Institut Català de la Dona.
 Fundació Maria Aurèlia Capmany i  Reñé Ferrando, Teresa (2002). Ciutadana Maria Aurèlia Capmany: escriptora i dona d'acció. Barcelona: Fundació Maria Aurèlia Capmany. 
 Graells, Guillem-Jordi (1990). “Maria Aurèlia Capmany, un bosc per a viure-hi”, Serra d'Or, març 1990.
 (1992). Maria Aurèlia Capmany. Barcelona: Diputació de Barcelona.
 (1992). “Presentació”, Preguntes i respostes sobre la vida i la mort de Francesc Layret, advocat dels obrers de Catalunya, Maria Aurèlia Capmany i Xavier Romeu. Barcelona: Institut del Teatre. 
 (1992). “La narrativa de Maria Aurèlia Capmany, un calidoscopi fascinant”, Maria Aurèlia Capmany Farnés (1918-1991). Barcelona: Ajuntament de Barcelona, pàgs. 95-128.
 (1993). “La producció literària de Maria Aurèlia Capmany I. La novel·la (a)”, Obra Completa I de Maria Aurèlia Capmany. Barcelona: Columna, pàgs. IX-XXVIII.
 (1994). “La producció literària de Maria Aurèlia Capmany II. La novel·la (b)”, Obra Completa II de Maria Aurèlia Capmany. Barcelona: Columna, pàgs.IX-XXIII.
 (1995). “La producció literària de Maria Aurèlia Capmany III. La novel·la (c)”, Obra Completa III de Maria Aurèlia Capmany. Barcelona: Columna, pàgs.XI-XXIII.
 (1996). “La producció literària de Maria Aurèlia Capmany IV. La narrativa breu. Apèndix: El cel no és transparent”, Obra Completa IV de Maria Aurèlia Capmany. Barcelona: Columna, pàgs. XI-XXV.
 (1998).  “La producció literària de Maria Aurèlia Capmany V. Teatre”, Obra Completa V de Maria Aurèlia Capmany. Barcelona: Columna, pàgs.XI-XXXVIII.
 (1997). “La producció literària de Maria Aurèlia Capmany  6. Memòries”, ”, Obra Completa VI de Maria Aurèlia Capmany. Barcelona: Columna, pàgs. XI-XXII.
 (2000). ““La producció literària de Maria Aurèlia Capmany  VII. La dona”, Obra Completa VII de Maria Aurèlia Capmany. Barcelona: Columna, pàgs. V-XII.
 Julià, Lluïsa (1999). “Quan les dones fumen. Maria Aurèlia Capmany-Simone de Beauvoir”, Memòria de l'aigua. Onze escriptores i el seu món, Lluïsa Julià (ed.),  Barcelona: Proa, pàg. 89-122.
 Nadal, Marta (1991).  “Maria Aurèlia Capmany: Combativity and tenderness in a writer from Barcelona”, Catalan Writing, núm. 7. pàgs. 25-37.
 Pablos, M. del Mar (2001). El fons documental Vidal-Capmany dipositat a la biblioteca de la Universitat Rovira i Virgili: tractament i descripció. Tarragona: Universitat Rovira i Virgili.
 Palau, Montserrat (2008). Maria Aurèlia Capmany. Escriure la vida en femení, Tarragona: Arola.
 Palau, Montserrat i Martínez Gili, Raül-David (eds.) (2002). Maria Aurèlia Capmany: l'afirmació en la paraula,  Valls: Cossetània.
 Pedrolo, Manuel de (1974). “Impressions-expressions sobre tres novel·les de la Maria Aurèlia Capmany”, Obra Completa. vol. I. Barcelona: Editorial Nova Terra.
 Pessarrodona, Marta (1996). Maria Aurèlia Capmany, un retrat. (Fotografies de Pilar Aymeric). Barcelona: Institut Català de la Dona. 
 Pons, Agustí (2000). Maria Aurèlia Capmany. L'època d'una dona. Barcelona: Columna.
 Sarsanedas, Jordi (1958). “Llegeixo les novel·les de Maria Aurèlia Capmany”, Cita de narradors. Barcelona: Ed. Selecta.
 Vidal Alcover, Jaume (1986). Maria Aurèlia Capmany en els seus millors escrits. Barcelona: Miquel Arimany editor, pàgs. 7-31.
 Jaume Vidal Alcover i Maria Aurèlia Capmany a escena. (2012)

References

External links

 Foundation Maria Aurèlia Capmany
 Webpage devoted to Maria Aurèlia Capmany at LletrA (UOC), Catalan Literature Online (English)

1918 births
1991 deaths
People from Barcelona
Catalan dramatists and playwrights
Spanish essayists
Women writers from Catalonia
Spanish women essayists
Spanish women novelists
Women dramatists and playwrights
20th-century Spanish women writers
20th-century Spanish novelists
20th-century Spanish dramatists and playwrights
20th-century essayists